Mohammad Zahirullah (19 August 1935 – disappeared 30 January 1972), known as Zahir Raihan, was a Bangladeshi novelist, writer and filmmaker. He is most notable for his documentary Stop Genocide (1971), made during the Bangladesh Liberation War. He was posthumously awarded Ekushey Padak in 1977 and Independence Day Award in 1992 by the Government of Bangladesh.

Early life and education
Mohammad Zahirullah was born on 19 August 1935, at Majupur, a village in the Feni Mahakuma under Noakhali district of the Bengal Presidency in British India (now Feni district in Bangladesh). After the Partition of Bengal in 1947, he, along with his parents, returned to his village from Calcutta. He obtained his bachelor's in Bengali from the University of Dhaka. He received his postgraduate degree in Bengali literature.

Career
Along with literary works, Raihan started working as a journalist, when he joined Juger Alo in 1950. Later, he also worked in newspapers, namely Khapchhara, Jantrik, and Cinema. He also worked as the editor of Probaho in 1956. His first collection of short stories, titled Suryagrahan, was published in 1955. He worked as an assistant director on the Urdu film Jago Hua Savera in 1957. This was his first direct involvement in film. He also assisted Salahuddin in the film Je Nadi Marupathe. The filmmaker Ehtesham also employed him on his film E Desh Tomar Amar, for which he wrote the title song. In 1960, he made his directorial début with Kokhono Asheni, which was released in 1961. In 1964, he made Pakistan's first colour film, Sangam, and completed his first CinemaScope film, Bahana, the following year.

Raihan was an active supporter of the Bengali Language Movement of 1952 and was present at the historical meeting of Amtala on 21 February 1952. He was among the first group of people who got arrested on the day. The effect of the Bengali Language Movement was so strong on him that he used it as the premise of his landmark film Jibon Theke Neya. He also took part in the 1969 Mass uprising in East Pakistan.

In the immediate aftermath of the March 1971 start of the Bangladesh Liberation War, Raihan made the documentary Stop Genocide. Critic Ziaul Haq Swapan calls it the start of the history of Bangladeshi documentaries and describes it as "a vehement protest against the  Pakistan army’s pogrom in Bangladesh". Raihan also made the documentary A State is Born during the war. Raihan went to Calcutta during the conflict, where his film Jibon Theke Neya was shown. His film was highly acclaimed by Satyajit Ray, Ritwik Ghatak, Mrinal Sen, and Tapan Sinha. Though he was in financial difficulties at the time, he gave all his money from the Calcutta showing to the Freedom Fighters trust.

Personal life
Raihan had been married twice, to Sumita Devi in 1961 and Shuchonda in 1968, both of whom were film actresses. With Sumita he had two sons, Bipul Raihan and Anol Raihan. He, with Shuchonda, had also two sons named Opu Raihan and Topu Raihan.

Disappearance
Raihan disappeared on 30 January 1972, when he was trying to locate his brother, a notable writer Shahidullah Kaiser, who was captured and presumably killed by the Pakistan army and/or local collaborators during the final days of the liberation war. It is believed that he was killed with many others when armed Bihari collaborators and soldiers of the Pakistan Army who were hiding fired on them when they went to Mirpur, a suburb of the capital city of Dhaka that was one of few strongholds for Pakistani/Bihari collaborators at that time.

Books

Novels

Short stories

Filmography

Director

Films
 Kokhono Asheni, 1961
 Sonar Kajol, 1962 (jointly with Kalim Sharafi)
 Kancher Deyal, 1963
 Sangam, 1964, Urdu
 Bahana, 1965, Urdu
 Behula, 1966
 Anwara, 1967
 Jibon Theke Neya, 1970
 Jaltey Suraj Ke Neeche, 1971, Urdu
 Let There Be Light, unfinished

Documentary films
 Stop Genocide, 1971
 A State is Born, 1971

Producer
 Kancher Deyal, 1963
 Sangam, 1964, Urdu
 Bahana, 1965, Urdu
 Behula, 1966
 Roi Bhai, 1967
 Dui Bhai, 1968
 Shuorani Duorani, 1968
 Moner Moto Bou, 1969
 Shesh Parjyanta, 1969
 Jibon Theke Neya, 1970, with A. Rahman

Awards
 Adamjee Literary Award
 Bangla Academy Literary Award (1972)
 Ekushey Padak (1977)
 Independence Day Award (1992)
 Bangladesh National Film Awards (2005)

See also
 List of people who disappeared

References

Footnotes

Bibliography

External links
 
 

1935 births
1970s missing person cases
20th-century dramatists and playwrights
20th-century male writers
20th-century novelists
Bangladeshi dramatists and playwrights
Bangladeshi film directors
Bangladeshi male novelists
Documentary war filmmakers
Male dramatists and playwrights
Missing people
People from Feni District
Recipients of Bangla Academy Award
Best Dialogue National Film Award (Bangladesh) winners
Recipients of the Adamjee Literary Award
Recipients of the Ekushey Padak
Recipients of the Independence Day Award
University of Dhaka alumni
Best Story National Film Award (Bangladesh) winners
Missing person cases in Bangladesh